Shein is a surname. Notable people with the name include:

 Aleksei Shein (1662–1700), Russian commander
 Ali Mohamed Shein (born 1948), Tanzanian politician
 Arn Shein (1928–2007), American sports writer
 Khan Shein Kunwar (born 1955), Indian writer
 Kyaw Shein (born 1938), Burmese sports shooter at the 1964 Olympics
 Mikhail Shein (died 1634), Russian general
 Oleg Shein (born 1972), Russian politician, member of the State Duma
 Valery Shein (born 1945), Soviet alpine skier at the 1964 Olympics
 Win Shein (born 1957), Burmese military officer and Minister for Finance

Other uses
 Shein (company), Chinese online fast fashion retailer

See also
 
 
 Battle of Deir el Shein
 Bei Mir Bistu Shein, Yiddish song
 Shien (disambiguation)
 Shine (disambiguation)
 Shin (disambiguation)

Jewish surnames
Yiddish-language surnames